Gokyo Lakes are oligotrophic lakes in Nepal's Sagarmatha National Park, located at an altitude of  above sea level. Lakes and resort were named after Gokyo Ri peak. These lakes are the world's highest freshwater lake system comprising six main lakes, of which Thonak Lake is the largest. In September 2007, Gokyo and associated wetlands of  have been designated a Ramsar site.

Lake system
Gokyo Lakes are located in Khumjung Village Development Committee of Solukhumbu District in Sagarmatha Zone in north-eastern Nepal. As sources of permanent fresh water they have high hydrological value. They feed on waters from various sources, such as seepage from the Ngozumpa glacier, a stream coming from the Renjo La pass from north-west and another stream originating from the Ngozumpa glacier in the east. These are glacier-fed freshwater wetlands and discharge water to the Dudh Kosi headway via the Taujon Lake and the Longabanga Lake. These lakes are deeper than previously assumed by the researchers. Fourth Lake (Thonak Cho) is the deepest lake (62.4 m) followed by the Gokyo Lake which is 43 m. A direct connection between the Gokyo Lake and the upper Thonak Cho and the Ngozumpa Cho has not been observed, but these lakes may be connected via underground seepage water. The Gokyo lake system is naturally vulnerable, as it is lying in an ecologically fragile and unstable zone. The outburst of Ngozumpa glacier is always a threat to the existence of the lakes.

The wetland lies on the head of the Dudh Kosi, which descends from Cho Oyu.

Religious significance 
The Gokyo Lakes are considered sacred by both Hindus and Buddhists. About 500 Hindus take a holy bath in the lakes during the Janai Purnima festival, which usually occurs in the month of August. On an average 7,000 tourists annually visit the Gokyo Lakes. The site is worshipped as the residing place of 'Nag Devata' (Snake God); a temple of the Hindu deities Lords Vishnu and Shiva is situated at the western corner of the lake. The belief that birds and wildlife in the area should not be harmed has traditionally protected fauna.

Tourism
Gokyo is among the most popular tourist destinations leading towards the Sagarmatha base camp and other areas. Gokyo village at  elevation is a major centre in the area. The site is two days' walk uphill from Namche Bazaar. A visit to the area often includes climbing Gokyo Ri.

The Gokyo Lakes are also part of an extended Everest Base Camp trek known as the EBC trek via Gokyo Lakes. This trek is commonly hiked by people with slightly more time to trek as the trail is 4 days longer than the standard EBC trek. The Gokyo Lakes trek also has the added benefit of being a circular route as opposed to the standard EBC trek which returns along the same trail.

References

External links

Lakes of Koshi Province
Ramsar sites in Nepal